Balaclava railway station is located on the Sandringham line in Victoria, Australia. It serves the south-eastern Melbourne suburb of Balaclava, and opened on 19 December 1859.

Balaclava is an elevated station, and is located above the Carlisle Street rail overpass.

History
Balaclava station opened on 19 December 1859, when the railway line from Windsor was extended to North Brighton. Like the suburb itself, the station was named after the Battle of Balaclava, which occurred during the Crimean War in 1854.

On 3 December 1977, the station was damaged by fire. In 1981, the station buildings were rebuilt.

In 1996, two men found $200,000 in a drum buried beneath one of the platforms. They handed the money into the police and the find was reported in the media. In the same week, another man found a second drum under the platform, containing a similar quantity of money, which he also turned into the police. Because no one claimed it, both men were granted ownership of the money they found, despite being considered trespassers on land owned by the then Public Transport Corporation.

In June 2012, a $13.3 million upgrade to the station was announced. It involved widening the platforms, improving stair and ramp access, signage, booking office facilities, waiting rooms, wheelchair shelters and toilets, as well as the provision of new station canopies to increase weather protection. CCTV cameras were added, as well as provision for future lifts. In October 2014, construction works were completed, with Balaclava upgraded to a Premium Station.

Following a 2019 commitment by the Federal Government, the station was due to receive an upgraded commuter car park. However, this was scrapped by the same government in 2021.

Platforms and services
Balaclava has two side platforms. It is served by Sandringham line trains.

Platform 1:
  all stations services to Flinders Street

Platform 2:
  all stations services to Sandringham

Transport links
Yarra Trams operates two routes via Balaclava station:
 : Melbourne University – East Malvern (operates as 3a on weekends and Public Holidays)
 : Melbourne University – Kew

References

External links
 
 Melway map at street-directory.com.au

Premium Melbourne railway stations
Railway stations in Australia opened in 1859
Railway stations in Melbourne
Railway stations in the City of Port Phillip